Erik ten Hag (born 2 February 1970) is a Dutch professional football coach and former player who is currently the manager of Premier League club Manchester United. 

Ten Hag played as a central defender and began his career with Eredivisie club Twente; he joined De Graafschap in 1990, and won the Eerste Divisie in his first season. He rejoined Twente in 1992 and transferred to RKC Waalwijk two years later, where he remained for one season before signing with Utrecht in 1995. Ten Hag returned to Twente for a third time in 1996, where he won KNVB Cup in 2001. He retired in 2002, at age 32.

Ten Hag began his coaching career in 2012, being appointed as manager of Go Ahead Eagles, where he led the club to promotion to the Eredivisie in his debut season. He then joined Bayern Munich II in 2013, winning promotion to the Regionalliga Bayern in 2014. He returned to the Netherlands in 2015 as sporting director and head coach at Utrecht. He joined Ajax in 2017, where he won three Eredivisie titles, two KNVB Cups, and led the team to the semi-finals of the 2018–19 UEFA Champions League. In 2022, he was appointed at Manchester United.

Early life
Ten Hag was born in Haaksbergen, Overijssel.

Playing career
Ten Hag played primarily as a centre-back for Twente, De Graafschap, RKC Waalwijk and Utrecht. He had three stints with Twente, with whom he won the KNVB Cup in the 2000–01 season.

Ten Hag also won the Eerste Divisie with De Graafschap in the 1990–91 season, ten years before winning the cup with Twente. He retired from active playing in 2002 at the age of 32 while playing for Twente, after the end of the 2001–02 Eredivisie season.

Managerial career

Early career
In 2012, Ten Hag was appointed as manager of Go Ahead Eagles in the Eerste Divisie by Marc Overmars, who was a shareholder of the club. During his only season at Go Ahead Eagles, he led the team to its first promotion in 17 years.

He coached Bayern Munich II from 6 June 2013 until 2015 when he was replaced by Heiko Vogel. During his time as manager Ten Hag led his team to the Regionalliga Bayern.

Ten Hag then became the sporting director and head coach of Utrecht in summer 2015, where he led the club to fifth place during his first season. In the 2016–17 season, he improved FC Utrecht's final position to fourth, booking a place in the UEFA Europa League qualifiers.

Ajax
On 21 December 2017, he was appointed as the head coach of Ajax after the club dismissed Marcel Keizer. In 2019, he led his Ajax team to the semi-finals of the 2018–19 UEFA Champions League for the first time since 1997, by winning against defending champions Real Madrid 4–1 in the Santiago Bernabéu Stadium at the round of 16 stage, and also beating Juventus away 1–2 having drawn the first leg 1–1 at home in the quarterfinals. In the first leg of the semi-final, he led his team to take a 1–0 lead against Tottenham Hotspur in the recently completed Tottenham Hotspur Stadium. However in the second leg, a second half hat-trick by Lucas Moura for Tottenham Hotspur, with the last goal being scored in the 96th minute to make it 3–2 (3–3 on aggregate) to win on away goals, ended Ajax's hopes of playing in the final.

He won his first managerial trophy with Ajax on 5 May 2019, the 2018–19 KNVB Cup, beating Willem II in the final. Only 10 days after winning the cup, Ajax, led by Ten Hag won the Eredivisie as well after a 1–4 away victory over De Graafschap and brought the double back to the club.

Ajax kicked off their 2019–20 season in style, with a 2–0 victory over long term rivals PSV in the 2019 Johan Cruyff Shield. During the 2019–20 Eredivisie season, Ajax started strong, drawing only twice and winning 14 in their first 16 matches. This was followed by successive defeats to Willem II and to AZ Alkmaar. Ajax's form following these defeats fluctuated, with the club going on to lose 3 further games in their next 8, as well as a second league defeat of the season to AZ Alkmaar. However, due to the emergence of the global COVID-19 pandemic, the Eredivisie season was null and voided, which meant that despite Ajax being top on goal difference to AZ Alkmaar, there wouldn't be an official winner of the 2019–20 Eredivisie season. Ajax's European campaign was relatively less successful compared to the previous season, having finished third in their group in the 2019–20 Champions League and being subsequently relegated to the UEFA Europa League. Ajax was resultantly knocked out by Getafe after a 3–2 aggregate loss in the Round of 32 of the 2019–20 Europa League. 

Ajax began the 2020–21 season strongly, winning their first 3 games before a 1–0 defeat at FC Groningen, which proved to be one of the two league defeats that Ten Hag's team sustained over the course of the season. On the 24th of October 2020, Ten Hag led Ajax to a Historic 13–0 victory over VVV-Venlo, breaking the Eredivisie record of the biggest recorded victory in the history of the competition. Ajax's form in Europe improved as well under Ten Hag, with the team looking promising despite a second consecutive relegation to the Europa League having finished third in their UEFA Champions League group. Their subsequent form in the Europa League improved, with convincing victories over Lille and BSC Young Boys in the Round of 32 and Round of 16 respectively progressing Ajax to the Quarter Finals. However, Ajax was unable to progress and Ten Hag's team suffered a 3–2 aggregate defeat to AS Roma, ending any hopes of a possible UEFA Europa League final. On 18 April 2021, Ten Hag guided Ajax to their record-extending 20th KNVB Cup with a 2–1 win over Vitesse in the final. Two weeks later, Ten Hag extended his contract with Ajax through to the end of the 2022–23 season. 

Ajax began the 2021–22 campaign with a 4–0 defeat in the Johan Cruyff Shield to PSV Eindhoven, before swiftly picking up form in the league, going unbeaten for their first 7 matches before sustaining a 1–0 home defeat FC Utrecht. This proved to be one of Ajax' 3 league defeats over the season as Ajax cruised past the competition once more under the guidance of Ten Hag. Ajax would once again record a historical victory as they beat PSV 5–0 at home on the 24th of October 2021. Ajax's European form also drastically improved, with goals from Sebastian Haller and an incredible style of football orchestrated by ten Hag guiding Ajax to a perfect group stage record, winning all six of their group matches in the 2021–22 UEFA Champions League. On 16 January 2022, ten Hag became the fastest manager in league history to reach 100 wins with Ajax, achieving the feat in 128 matches, when his side beat Utrecht 3–0 away on match day 19.

Ajax would eventually be knocked out by S.L. Benfica in the round of 16, whilst cruising towards their 3rd Eredivisie title in 4 years after a 5–0 home victory over SC Heerenveen on the 11th of May 2022. Ten Hag's side also reached the 2022 KNVB Cup Final, which would eventually end in a 2–1 victory for PSV Eindhoven, ending Ten Hag's hopes of a 3rd League and cup double in 4 and a half years in charge in Amsterdam.

Manchester United

On 21 April 2022, Ten Hag was appointed as manager of Manchester United starting from the end of the 2021–22 season until June 2025, with the option of extending for a further year. Mitchell van der Gaag and Steve McClaren were later revealed to be joining Ten Hag as part of his coaching staff. On 16 May, it was confirmed that Ten Hag had left his Ajax role early in order to begin his preparations as Manchester United manager for the 2022–23 season. Ten Hag lost his first Premier League match, 2–1 at home to Brighton & Hove Albion on 7 August. Following a 4–0 defeat away to Brentford on 13 August in his second Premier League match, Ten Hag became the first Manchester United manager since John Chapman in 1921 to lose his first two games in charge. On 22 August, Ten Hag won his first competitive game as Manchester United manager when his side recorded a 2–1 victory against arch-rivals Liverpool at Old Trafford. This was United's first league win against Liverpool since March 2018. On 11 January 2023, Ten Hag led Manchester United to a 3–0 win over Charlton Athletic in the EFL Cup, and in doing so became the fastest Manchester United manager to reach 20 competitive wins, achieving the feat in 27 games. On 26 February, Ten Hag's side beat Newcastle United 2–0 to win the EFL Cup, claiming their first trophy since 2017.

However, in their first league game after lifting the trophy, Ten Hag's side lost a record 7–0 at Anfield, home of their rivals Liverpool. It was the heaviest defeat in the history of that fixture, as well as United's joint-heaviest defeat ever and the first time they had conceded seven goals since 1931.

Personal life 	
Ten Hag is married to Bianca. The couple have two daughters and a son.

Playing statistics

Managerial statistics

Honours

Player
De Graafschap
Eerste Divisie: 1990–91

Twente
KNVB Cup: 2000–01

Manager
Bayern Munich II
Regionalliga Bayern: 2013–14

Ajax
Eredivisie: 2018–19, 2020–21, 2021–22
KNVB Cup: 2018–19, 2020–21
Johan Cruyff Shield: 2019

Manchester United
 EFL Cup: 2022–23

Individual
Rinus Michels Award: 2015–16, 2018–19, 2020–21
 Premier League Manager of the Month: September 2022, February 2023

References

External links

Voetbal International – Erik ten Hag

1970 births
Living people
People from Haaksbergen
Footballers from Overijssel
Dutch footballers
Association football defenders
FC Twente players
De Graafschap players
RKC Waalwijk players
FC Utrecht players
Eredivisie players
Eerste Divisie players
Dutch football managers
Go Ahead Eagles managers
FC Bayern Munich II managers
FC Utrecht managers
AFC Ajax managers
Manchester United F.C. managers
Eredivisie managers
Eerste Divisie managers
Regionalliga managers
Premier League managers
Rinus Michels Award winners
Dutch expatriate football managers
Expatriate football managers in Germany
Dutch expatriate sportspeople in Germany
Expatriate football managers in England
Dutch expatriate sportspeople in England